{{DISPLAYTITLE:C15H14O3}}
The molecular formula C15H14O3 (molar mass : 242.26 g/mol, exact mass: 242.094294) may refer to:
 Equol, an isoflavandiol
 Fenoprofen, a nonsteroidal anti-inflammatory drug
 Lapachol
 Leucoanthocyanidin
 4-Methoxyresveratrol, a stilbenoid
 Mexenone
 Pinostilbene (3-methoxyresveratrol), a stilbenoid
 Taraxacin a guaianolide